Wu Chaozheng (1905 – 20 April 1933) was a Chinese officer in the National Revolutionary Army who died during the defense of the Great Wall, a military campaign against the Japanese. After his death, top Chinese leaders Chiang Kai-shek, T.V. Soong, Sun Fo, as well as top military brass Zhu Peide, Zhang Zhizhong, Cai Tingkai, Liu Zhi and his immediate leader Huang Chieh all wrote epitaphs in his memory.

Wu Chaozheng was a graduate of the Whampoa Military Academy.

Legacy
In 2013, Wu Chaozheng Memorial Hall was built on the property of Wu Zuquan (Wu Chaozheng's son), in Qiaoxia Town (桥下), Yongjia County, Zhejiang, where Wu Chaozheng formerly lived. The hall covers 800 square metres (the building covers 310), and was built on a ¥750,000 budget.

In fiction
Ti Lung stars as Wu Chaozheng in the 1976 Hong Kong film 7-Man Army, directed by Chang Cheh.

References

1905 births
1933 deaths
People from Yongjia County
Whampoa Military Academy alumni